Pterolepis glomerata, the false meadowbeauty, is a plant species in the family Melastomataceae. The plant grows in humid grasslands and in gardens. Its distribution is neotropical.

References

Further reading
Wurdack, J.J. (1962): Melastomataceae of Santa Catarina. Sellowia 14: 109–217.

Melastomataceae